Sharin (also Romanized as Shārīn; also known as Chārūn) is a village in Ak Rural District, Esfarvarin District, Takestan County, Qazvin Province, Iran. At the 2006 census, its population was 313, in 72 families.

References 

Populated places in Takestan County